Thyreophagus is a genus of mites in the family Acaridae.

Species
 Thyreophagus africanus Mahunka, 1974
 Thyreophagus aleurophagus (Sicher, 1894)
 Thyreophagus angusta (Banks, 1906)
 Thyreophagus annae (Sevastianov & Kivganov, 1992)
 Thyreophagus athiasae (Fain, 1982)
 Thyreophagus berlesianus Zachvatkin, 1941
 Thyreophagus cercus Zhang, in Zhang, Jiang & Zeng 1994
 Thyreophagus cooremani Fain, 1982
 Thyreophagus corticalis (Michael, 1885)
 Thyreophagus cynododactylon El-Bishlawy, 1990
 Thyreophagus entomophagus (Laboulbéne & Robin, 1862)
 Thyreophagus evansi (Fain, 1982)
 Thyreophagus gallegoi Portus & Gomez, 1980
 Thyreophagus incanus (Fain, 1987)
 Thyreophagus johnstoni (Fain, 1982)
 Thyreophagus leclercqi (Fain, 1982)
 Thyreophagus lignieri (Zachvatkin, 1953)
 Thyreophagus longiretinalis (Klimov, 1999)
 Thyreophagus macfarlanei (Fain, 1982)
 Thyreophagus magnus Berlese, 1910
 Thyreophagus odyneri Fain, 1982
 Thyreophagus passerinus (de-la-Cruz, 1990)
 Thyreophagus polezhaevi (Zakhvatkin, 1953)
 Thyreophagus rwandanus (Fain, 1982)
 Thyreophagus spinitarsus (Fain, 1982)
 Thyreophagus tridens (Fain & Lukoschus, 1986)
 Thyreophagus vermicularis Fain & Lukoschus, 1982

References

Acaridae